Atammik (old spelling: Atangmik) is a settlement in the Qeqqata municipality in central-western Greenland. Located on the shores of Davis Strait, it had 196 inhabitants in 2020. It is the southernmost settlement in the municipality. The local Royal Greenland fish processing factory was closed in July 2010.

Population 
The population of Atammik has remained relatively stable over the last two decades, decreasing in the last several years.

References 

Davis Strait
Populated places in Greenland
Qeqqata